The 2005 Grote Prijs Jef Scherens was the 39th edition of the Grote Prijs Jef Scherens cycle race and was held on 4 September 2005. The race started and finished in Leuven. The race was won by Joost Posthuma.

General classification

References

2005
2005 in road cycling
2005 in Belgian sport